Joshua Michael Romanski (born October 18, 1986) is an American minor league baseball outfielder who is a free agent. He is a former left-handed pitcher. Prior to beginning his professional career,  Romanski attended the University of San Diego.

Amateur career
Romanski was drafted by the San Diego Padres in the 15th round of the 2005 Major League Baseball draft. Though Romanski and the Padres negotiated towards the signing deadline, the two parties could not reach an agreement, and Romanski enrolled at the University of San Diego. Playing for the San Diego Toreros baseball team in the West Coast Conference (WCC), Romanski established himself as a two-way threat, as a pitcher and outfielder. Collegiate Baseball named him a Freshman All-American and he won the WCC Freshman of the Year Award.

As a sophomore, Romanski was named a second-team All-American and first-team All-WCC. That summer, he played in the 2007 Pan American Games and 2007 World Port Tournament with Toreros teammate Brian Matusz. In his junior year, Romanski hit .324 and was 9-1 with a 4.00 ERA. He was first-team All-WCC and threw a no-hitter against the Harvard Crimson baseball team. Baseball America and Louisville Slugger named him a third-team All-American.

Professional career
The Milwaukee Brewers drafted Romanski in the fourth round (128th overall) of the 2008 Major League Baseball draft. After playing in four games for the Helena Brewers of the Rookie Advanced Pioneer League in 2008, Romanski missed the 2009 season with an arm injury that required elbow surgery. The Brewers released Romanski, and he signed with the New York Yankees as a minor league free agent in April 2010.

Romanski pitched for the Charleston RiverDogs of the Class-A South Atlantic League and Tampa Yankees of the Class-A Advanced Florida State League in 2010. Romanski began the 2011 season with Tampa, but was promoted to the Trenton Thunder of the Class-AA Eastern League, where he was used as a relief pitcher. After being traded to the White Sox mid season he was released at the end.

He converted to an outfielder and spent the 2014 and 2016 seasons in independent ball, in the American Association Central and North Divisions, respectively, playing for the Gary SouthShore RailCats in 2014 and the Winnipeg Goldeyes in 2016.

Romanski signed a minor-league contract with the Minnesota Twins in the 2017 offseason, but was released prior to the beginning of the 2017 season. He re-signed with the Winnipeg Goldeyes for the season, batting .324 with 11 home runs and 81 RBIs in 98 games as he helped the team win its second consecutive championship and was named league MVP.

On March 22, 2018, Romanski signed with the Pericos de Puebla of the Mexican League. He was released on May 1, 2018. Romanski later re-signed with the Winnipeg Goldeyes on June 22, 2018. He was released by the Goldeyes on June 24, 2019.

On July 19, 2019, Romanski signed with the St. Paul Saints of the American Association. He was released on July 29, 2019.

Personal
The same day he was drafted by the Brewers, Romanski's mother was diagnosed with breast cancer. His younger brother Jake is a catcher in the Boston Red Sox organization.

References

External links

USD Toreros Biography – Josh Romanski

1986 births
Living people
American expatriate baseball players in Canada
American expatriate baseball players in Mexico
American people of Polish descent
Atenienses de Manatí (baseball) players
Baseball players at the 2007 Pan American Games
Baseball players from California
Birmingham Barons players
Charleston RiverDogs players
Gary SouthShore RailCats players
Helena Brewers players
Liga de Béisbol Profesional Roberto Clemente outfielders
Mexican League baseball center fielders
Mexican League baseball right fielders
Pan American Games silver medalists for the United States
Pan American Games medalists in baseball
People from Corona, California
Pericos de Puebla players
San Diego Toreros baseball players
Scranton/Wilkes-Barre RailRiders players
St. Paul Saints players
Staten Island Yankees players
Tampa Yankees players
Trenton Thunder players
United States national baseball team players
Winnipeg Goldeyes players
Medalists at the 2007 Pan American Games